Thompson Park is a public park located at 805 Newman Springs Road in the Lincroft section of Middletown Township, New Jersey. The  park is operated by the Monmouth County Park System. In 1968, at the bequest of Geraldine Morgan Thompson,  of the Brookdale Farm were donated to the county to create the park. The Brookdale Farm Historic District, located in the park, was added to the National Register of Historic Places in 2020. The visitor center is a reconstruction of the Thompson Mansion, which was destroyed by a fire in 2006. The original mansion had been remodeled and expanded by the architectural firm of Carrère and Hastings in 1896.

References

External links 
 

Middletown Township, New Jersey
County parks in New Jersey
Parks in Monmouth County, New Jersey